Meganeuropsis is an extinct genus of griffinfly, order Meganisoptera, known from the Early Permian Wellington Formation of North America, and represents the largest known insect of all time. Meganeuropsis existed during the Artinskian age of the Permian period, 290.1–283.5 mya. The genus includes two described species by Frank Morton Carpenter, fossil insect curator at the Museum of Comparative Zoology at Harvard University:

Meganeuropsis permiana described in 1939 from Elmo, Kansas. The holotype is held in the Museum of Comparative Zoology.

Meganeuropsis americana, discovered in Noble, Oklahoma in 1940, is most probably a junior synonym of Meganeuropsis permiana. The holotype is held in the Museum of Comparative Zoology.

See also

References 

Meganisoptera
Permian animals of North America
Permian insects
Artinskian
Cisuralian life
Paleontology in Kansas
Paleontology in Oklahoma
Fossil taxa described in 1939
Taxa named by Frank M. Carpenter